The 1946 Sam Houston State Bearkats football team was an American football team that represented Sam Houston State Teachers College (now known as Sam Houston State University) as a member of the Lone Star Conference (LSC) during the 1946 college football season. In their sixth non-consecutive season under head coach Puny Wilson and their first season since the end of World War II, the Bearkats compiled a 6–2–1 record  (3–1–1 against LSC opponents), finished in second place in the conference, and outscored opponents by a total of 130 to 53.

The team played its home games at Pritchett Field  in Huntsville, Texas.

Schedule

References

Sam Houston State
Sam Houston Bearkats football seasons
Sam Houston State Bearkats football